Randy Valiente is a comic book artist born in Philippines. He considers Hal Santiago and Nestor Redondo among his artistic influences.

Selected bibliography
Headlocked by writer Michael Kingston, with art by Randy Valiente

References

External links
 Interview with Randy – Sigmate Studio

Filipino comics artists
Living people
Year of birth missing (living people)